Chestnut is an unincorporated community in Natchitoches Parish, Louisiana, United States.

Notable person

Roy Sanders, educator who served in the Louisiana House of Representatives from 1948 to 1952

Notes

Unincorporated communities in Natchitoches Parish, Louisiana
Unincorporated communities in Louisiana
Populated places in Ark-La-Tex